The Massacre of Catania is a highly disputed historical event that took place in the city of Catania in 340 AD. According to some historians, it was carried out by North African mercenaries acting under the commands of Emperor Constantine II and targeted an unknown group of religious minorities. Some historians estimate that 700 people were killed in the event. Others have criticized this theory, believing the event to be a mere rumor spread in the service of political rivalries.

Background 
Shortly after the First Council of Nicea in 325 AD, Catania experienced a large population boom. This was largely because the city quickly established itself as a haven for religious minorities, resulting in a mass migration of different marginalized sects. By 340 AD, entire districts of the city had become safe havens for specific religious groups. This produced a considerable boost to the city's economy, and led to it temporarily emerging as a new artistic hub within the Roman republic. By all accounts, the city's new ethnic and religious groups maintained a harmonious relationship with the city's pre-existing citizens.

The Massacre 
The general theory of the event is that in 340 AD, Constantine II sent a legion of mercenaries into the city under the cover of night. Their orders were to employ scorched earth tactics, killing everyone they encountered and burning the district's buildings to the ground. According to some historians, the undertaking was so secretive that Constantine II specifically requested foreign mercenaries who did not speak the local language, just to prevent word from getting out. Despite many accusations that this theory is outlandish, these theorists maintain that by conducting this massacre with surgical precision, and leaving the neighboring districts completely untouched, the forces guaranteed the rest of the city's complicit silence.

Controversy 
Most credible sources have attacked this theory, citing a lack of credible sources. The only primary source that so much alludes to this event is a section in Lives of Philosophers and Sophists, written by Eunapius, a Greek historian whose body of work was highly critical of both Constantine and Constantine II. As such, this source has largely been written off as a legend created by political rivals in order to discredit his regime.

Notes and references 

 English translation of the Lives of the Philosophers and Sophists and Introduction by Wilmer Cave Wright (translator) from the Tertullian Project.
 
 

4th century
Massacres in Italy
Religious persecution
Constantine the Great